Catacora Municipality is the second municipal section of the José Manuel Pando Province in the  La Paz Department, Bolivia. Its seat is Catacora.

Geography 
Some of the highest mountains of the municipality are listed below:

See also 
 Parina Quta

References 

 Instituto Nacional de Estadistica de Bolivia

Municipalities of La Paz Department (Bolivia)